Mountain View Cemetery and Mausoleum is a historic cemetery in Altadena, California, United States. It also contains a section for Civil War burials.

The cemetery also includes a mausoleum, located across the street on Marengo Avenue, and the Pasadena Mausoleum, on Raymond Avenue.About us - Mountain View's official website

History
In the frontier era, the residents of Pasadena buried their relatives on family property. Colonel Jabez Banbury's son, Charles, for example, was buried on land that occupied part of the Arroyo Seco, now part of the Wrigley Estate. Banbury sold his property in 1882, at which point Levi W. Giddings set aside part of his own property to be used as a cemetery.

The following year, 24 burials were moved to the cemetery.

Between two burials is an empty grave with steel walls which is used in movies and television series to allow actors to get in and out for shooting purposes. Productions that have used the grave include American Horror Story, Promising Young Woman, Pretty Little Liars and Six Feet Under.

After the disappearance of Glenn Miller in 1944, it was rumored that he was buried in secret in Mountain View in the Altadena family plot.

Mountain View Mausoleum, located nearby, was built by Cecil E. Bryan.

Notable burials
 Herbert W. Armstrong
 John C. Austin
 Jabez Banbury
 Eldridge Cleaver
 Richard Feynman
 Henry H. Markham
 George Reeves
 Seth Cook Rees
 Octavia E. Butler

References

External links
 
 

Altadena, California
1882 establishments in California
Cemeteries in Los Angeles County, California